William Thomas Brande FRS FRSE (11 January 178811 February 1866) was an English chemist.

Biography
Brande was born in Arlington Street, London, England, the youngest son of six children to Augustus Everard Brande an apothecary, originally from Hanover in Germany. He was educated first in Kensington and then in Westminster.

After leaving Westminster School, he was apprenticed, in 1802, to his brother, an apothecary, with the view of adopting the profession of medicine.

He studied medicine at Great Windmill Street Medical School and at St George's Hospital, before being drawn to chemistry following a meeting with Humphry Davy. He then began to lecture in chemistry, based on a sound knowledge of which he acquired in his spare time.

In 1811 he published the first of what were to be two very influential articles on the measurement of alcohol in fermented drinks, including wine, cider and ale. Until that point chemists had only been able to measure alcohol in distilled drinks (brandy, gin etc.), which many early temperance reformers had assumed to be a poison. By showing that alcohol was present in fermented drinks from the start (rather than being a by-product of the distillation process), Brande undermined the long-standing view that spirits were toxic, while wine and beer were more wholesome. These findings were later propagated by the Temperance movement and used to justify total alcoholic abstinence, or teetotalism.

In 1812 he was appointed professor of chemistry to the Apothecaries' Society, and delivered a course of lectures before the Board of Agriculture in place of Sir Humphry Davy, whom in the following year he succeeded in the chair of chemistry at the Royal Institution, London. In 1821 he was the first to isolate the element lithium, which he did by electrolysis of lithium oxide.

From about 1823 onwards, Brande worked increasingly with the Royal Mint, eventually becoming Superintendent of the Coining and Die Department.

Brande's Manual of Chemistry, first published in 1819, enjoyed wide popularity, and among other works he brought out a Dictionary of Science, Literature and Art in 1842. He was working on a new edition when he died at Tunbridge Wells.

He contributed articles to Rees's Cyclopædia on Chemistry, but the topics are not known.

Lectures
In 1834, 1836, 1839, 1842, 1844, 1847 and 1850 Brande was invited to deliver the Royal Institution Christmas Lecture on Chemistry; Chemistry of the Gases; The Chemistry of the Atmosphere and the Ocean; The Chemistry of the Non-Metallic Elements; The Chemistry of the Gases; The Elements of Organic Chemistry and The Chemistry of Coal respectively.

Publications
Outlines of Geology (1817)
Manual of Chemistry (1819)
Manual of Pharmacy (1825)
Dictionary of Materia Medica (1839)
Dictionary of Science, Literature and Art (1842)
Organic Chemistry (1854)

Family
He married Anna Frederica Hatchett, daughter of the eminent chemist Charles Hatchett in July 1818.

Death
Brande died in Tunbridge Wells in 1866, and is buried in West Norwood Cemetery, London (grave 1177, square 98).

References

Sources
 Obituary – from Proceedings of the Royal Society of London, volume XVI, 1868, pages ii – vi (at end of volume)
 
 Material on Brande's life and death  by Frank James
 

1788 births
1866 deaths
Scientists from London
English chemists
Recipients of the Copley Medal
People educated at Westminster School, London
Burials at West Norwood Cemetery
18th-century English people
19th-century English people
Fellows of the Royal Society